Ancistrus brevipinnis is a species of catfish in the family Loricariidae. It is a freshwater fish native to South America, where it occurs in the Lagoa dos Patos basin in Brazil. The species reaches 10.7 cm (4.2 inches) SL.

References 

brevipinnis
Fish described in 1904
Taxa named by Charles Tate Regan